Hertha is a feminine given name which may refer to:

 Hertha Ayrton (1854–1923), British engineer, mathematician, physicist and inventor
 Hertha Feiler (1916–1970), Austrian actress
 Hertha Feist (1896–1990), German expressionist dancer and choreographer
 Hertha or Herta Glaz (1910–2006), Austrian-born American opera singer, voice teacher and director
 Hertha Guthmar (born 1908), German film actress
 Hertha Natzler (1911–1985), Austrian stage and film actress
 Hertha Pauli (1906–1973), Austrian journalist, author and actress
 Hermine Hertha Pohl (1889–1954), German writer
 Hertha Sponer (1895–1968), German physicist and chemist
 Hertha Sturm (1886 – before or during 1945), German communist activist born Edith Fischer
 Hertha Thiele (1908–1984), German actress
 Hertha Töpper (1924–2020), Austrian opera singer
 Hertha Wambacher (1903–1950), Austrian physicist
 Hertha von Walther (1903–1987), German actress

German feminine given names